Lake Puelo is a lake located in the northern part of Chubut Province, in Argentine Patagonia. Of fluvial-glacial origin, its deepest point is 180 meters. The narrow L-shaped lake is surrounded by Lago Puelo National Park.  

The lake is fed by the small rivers, Azul and Quemquemtreu. The outflow from Puelo Lake is the Puelo River which flows to the Pacific Ocean through Chile.

The lake is surrounded by typical Valdivian temperate rain forests, more typical of the maritime-influenced area of Chile rather than the eastern side of the Andes in Argentina.

The term Puelo seems to have its origin in the Mapuche expression puel-có, (puel = east, co = water) meaning something like "Water at the East", as it was located in the easterly part of the area occupied by the indigenous Mapuche people.   

Tourism is the principal industry of the town and area.

References

External links

Tourism at Lago Puelo 
Information

Lakes of Chubut Province
Tourist attractions in Chubut Province
Patagonia